Blanchet House is a non-profit social services organization located in Portland, Oregon providing meals, transitional shelter, drug and alcohol recovery programs, and support services to those struggling with homelessness and addiction. As a House of Hospitality, Blanchet House welcomes everyone to enjoy hot meals without question six days a week, three times a day. Blanchet House was founded in 1952 by a group of University of Portland students encouraged by their priest to "get out in the streets and help."

History 
In the early 1940s, a group of University of Portland students started a fraternity called the Blanchet Club. The club took their name from Oregon’s first pioneer Catholic priest, Rev. Francis Norbert Blanchet. The students were encouraged by their club chaplain to “Do something meaningful” so they began doing acts of charity like serving sandwiches and coffee out of the back of a car to those experiencing homelessness and food insecurity. The founders believed that everyone in the world has a right to food, clothing, and shelter. They wanted to provide the poor, sick, homeless and unwanted people of Portland a place of immediate relief with no moral judgments or religious requirements. The men wanted to have a larger impact on the community, so they began searching for a permanent location to serve meals from.

In 1952, the Blanchet Club was able to rent the bottom floor of the building next door for their House of Hospitality. On Feb. 11, the group served its first meal to 227 people. 66 years later, Blanchet House now serve three meals a day, six days a week to on average 1,000 people a day. It is a house of hospitality, inspired by the Catholic Worker’s Movement. Dorothy Day and Peter Maurin created the Catholic Worker newspaper and then opened up houses of hospitality and farms. People across America, like the founders of Blanchet House, were so inspired by their activism that they started their own Catholic Worker communities, each one independent from each other. Now, the Catholic Worker movement can be seen as a dialogue between Catholic social teaching and radical Christian anarchism.
In 1962, a farm in Carlton, Oregon was purchased by Blanchet House which hosts a residential program for men who are rebuilding their lives from drug and alcohol addiction, job loss and other obstacles.

In 2010, Blanchet House received city approval to construct a new facility (at the former site of the Dirty Duck 
) which opened in 2012.

Blanchet House celebrated its 60th anniversary in 2012 by honoring supporters like Tracy Oseran, founder of Urban Gleaners and Portland City Commissioner Nick Fish who helped secure the site for their new building.

Programs

Free meals program 

Blanchet House serves nutritious meals in their Founders Cafe to anyone in need. Their public cafe is open for breakfast, lunch and dinner, Monday to Saturday. All are welcome. No questions asked. Blanchet House can serve up to 1,500 meals a day.

Impact 
In 2020, over 400,000 plates of food were served to the hungry in the Old Town part of downtown Portland and 175 men were provided with life-changing housing, clothing, support, and basic needs through Blanchet House's residential program.  As part of the meal service program, 400,000 lbs of fresh food were rescued from different vendors throughout the city, such as Trader Joe's, the Oregon Convention Center, and Whole Foods. Additionally, Blanchet House prepares and delivers meals to Portland's outdoor emergency shelters.

Sustainability and Green Initiatives 
Blanchet House is committed to creating as little food waste as possible. Blanchet House has different partnerships throughout the city to rescue their unused food. One of the most popular days for meal guests is on Saturday for Blanchet's pizza day. Unused slices from popular pizza places are collected and redistributed.

Blanchet House is unique amongst public kitchens in that it has nearly zero food waste. Blanchet sends its own leftover food waste to two different farms in the area including its own, Blanchet Farm. The food waste is turned into slop for pigs and other farm animals.

Blanchet's building itself is Leed Platinum Certified. The roof of the building serves as a green roof. Every time it rains, the water is collected and filtered through the roof and used as greywater throughout the building.

Residential housing program 

In addition to Blanchet House's free meal program, they operate a transitional living program for men at two different locations. The downtown location houses up to 55 men living here at any given time. In exchange for room, board and case management they volunteer to prepare and serve food for the free meal service. The men living at Blanchet House are working to rebuild their lives after struggling with homelessness, addiction, job loss and other issues. Unlike the low-barrier meal service where anyone is welcome, the residential program is a high barrier. Men must be sober during their time at Blanchet House.

The second location is out at a farm located in Carlton, Oregon. The founders wanted a second location away from the temptations of the city so that men could fully focus on their recovery. 22 men live on the farm where they do meaningful work like caring for animals, beekeeping, woodworking, gardening, and support each other in rebuilding their lives from addiction. Items from the woodshop are sold at different stores in downtown Portland that feature local craftsmen.

Volunteer 
Blanchet House would not be able to carry out its mission without its set of dedicated volunteers. Each meal service requires 12 volunteers per shift. Volunteers help with plating the food, serving meals to the guest's restaurant-style, and cleaning the tables after guests leave. Cooperate groups and schools (such as Kaiser Permamente, Wells Fargo, Jesuit High School, and Central Catholic) are the most frequented volunteers, but individuals can sign up online.

See also
 Yamaguchi Hotel

References

External links
 Blanchet House of Hospitality -

Homelessness
Catholic Worker Movement